Jarmund Øyen (born 6 March 1944) is a Norwegian politician for the Labour Party.

He served as a deputy representative to the Norwegian Parliament from Oppland during the terms 1993–1997 and 1997–2001. In total he met during 3 days of parliamentary session.

References

1944 births
Living people
Deputy members of the Storting
Labour Party (Norway) politicians
Oppland politicians
Place of birth missing (living people)
20th-century Norwegian politicians